Miyata is a Japanese manufacturer of bicycles, unicycles and fire extinguishers.

Miyata may also refer to:

Miyata 310, "semi-pro" road bicycle that was manufactured by Miyata until 1986.
Koga Miyata, Dutch bicycle manufacturer
Miyata, Fukuoka (宮田町, Miyata-machi) a former town located in Kurate District, Fukuoka Prefecture, Japan
Miyata (surname), people with the surname Miyata

See also 
 Miata (disambiguation)